The 2022 Karuizawa International Curling Championships were held from December 16 to 18 at the Karuizawa Ice Park in Karuizawa, Nagano, Japan. The total purse for the event was ¥ 1,500,000 on both the men's and women's sides. It was the first time the event has been held since 2019 due to the COVID-19 pandemic cancelling both the 2020 and 2021 editions.

Men

Teams
The teams are listed as follows:

Round-robin standings
Final round-robin standings

Round-robin results
All draw times are listed in Japan Standard Time (UTC+09:00).

Draw 1
Friday, December 16, 9:00 am

Draw 2
Friday, December 16, 1:30 pm

Draw 3
Friday, December 16, 6:00 pm

Draw 4
Saturday, December 17, 9:00 am

Draw 5
Saturday, December 17, 1:30 pm

Playoffs

Source:

Semifinals
Saturday, December 17, 6:00 pm

Third place game
Sunday, December 18, 9:00 am

Final
Sunday, December 18, 1:30 pm

Women

Teams
The teams are listed as follows:

Round-robin standings
Final round-robin standings

Round-robin results
All draw times are listed in Japan Standard Time (UTC+09:00).

Draw 1
Friday, December 16, 9:00 am

Draw 2
Friday, December 16, 1:30 pm

Draw 3
Friday, December 16, 6:00 pm

Draw 4
Saturday, December 17, 9:00 am

Draw 5
Saturday, December 17, 1:30 pm

Playoffs

Source:

Semifinals
Saturday, December 17, 6:00 pm

Third place game
Sunday, December 18, 9:00 am

Final
Sunday, December 18, 6:00 pm

References

External links
Official Website
Men's Event
Women's Event

2022 in Japanese sport
2022 in curling
December 2022 sports events in Japan
Curling competitions in Japan
International curling competitions hosted by Japan
Sport in Nagano Prefecture